The Bachelor of Religious Education (BRE) is an undergraduate degree.  It offers a broad education in the areas of scripture and Christian theology. It differs from a Bachelor of Arts degree in that approximately three-quarters of the program is invested in studies outside of the liberal arts. This degree is primarily offered by institutions of a Christian worldview, though not exclusively so.

Typically, a BRE degree will be sought by those individuals who are interested in serving as pastors, missionaries, evangelists, youth leaders, worship coordinators, or in other forms of local church ministry. Alternatively, some BRE graduates go on to careers in the fields of business, counseling, education, law, media, and writing.

Religious Education, Bachelor
Religious degrees